Michael Dusek (born 10 November 1958 in Niederwörresbach) is a German football coach and a former player.  As a player, he spent nine seasons in the Bundesliga with 1. FC Kaiserslautern.

Honours
 DFB-Pokal finalist: 1980–81

References

External links
 

1958 births
Living people
German footballers
Bundesliga players
1. FC Kaiserslautern players
German football managers
Association football defenders